Derby High School is a public high school in Derby, Kansas, United States, operated by Derby USD 260 public school district, and serves students in grades 9-12. The current principal is Tim Hamblin. The school colors are green and white.  It is the only public high school in the school district.  The total enrollment for the 2020–2021 school year was 2,185 students.

History
Derby High School, formally Derby Senior High School, has been located in four different buildings since 1911. The current Derby High School building, which is located East of Rock Road, North of Madison and South of James, was completed in the Fall of 1993 and is the largest high school building in Kansas. The students moved to the new building after the 1993/1994 Christmas break.  The former high school building at Madison and Woodlawn is now the Derby Middle School.

Academics
Derby High School is a comprehensive high school offering a variety of courses designed to meet the needs of the students in Derby USD 260. The courses offered each year are based upon student demands, as determined by enrollment selections, facilities, and staff available.

Extracurricular activities

Athletics
Derby High is a member of the Kansas State High School Activities Association and offers a variety of sports programs. Athletic teams compete in the 6A division, the largest division in the state of Kansas according to the KSHSAA, and are known as the "Panthers". More specifically, Derby is a Division 1 member of the Ark Valley Chisholm Trail League.

State championships

Derby High School offers the following sports:

Fall
 Football
 Volleyball
 Cross-Country
 Girls Golf
 Boys Soccer
 Girls Tennis
 Cheerleading
 Dance Team (Pantherettes)

Winter
 Basketball
 Wrestling
 Boys Bowling
 Girls Bowling
 Boys Swimming/Diving

Spring
 Baseball
 Boys Golf
 Boys Tennis
 Girls Soccer
 Girls Swimming/Diving
 Softball
 Track and Field

Notable alumni
 Carter Albrecht, former band member Edie Brickell & New Bohemians, Varenicline (Chantix) controversy
 Billy Campfield, former NFL player for the Philadelphia Eagles and the New York Giants
 Nick Reid, former NFL player for the Kansas City Chiefs, 2× 1st Team All-Big 12 and Big 12 2005 Defensive MVP at Kansas
 David Rickels, professional Mixed Martial Artist for Bellator MMA
 Dave Sanders, former MLB player (Chicago White Sox)

References

External links

 , official website
 USD 260

Public high schools in Kansas
Schools in Sedgwick County, Kansas
1911 establishments in Kansas